Phyllonorycter salictella is a moth of the family Gracillariidae. It is known from all of Europe (except the Balkan Peninsula and the Mediterranean islands), east to Russia and Japan.

The wingspan is 7–9 mm. The forewings are shining ochreous, sometimes fuscous-tinged; a median streak from base to near middle, four costal and three dorsal wedge-shaped spots obscure whitish-ochreous, ill-defined and sometimes very indistinct, first dorsal long; a blackish apical strigula. Hindwings are grey. The larva is pale yellowish; dorsal line dark grey; head pale brown.

There are two generations per year with adults on wing in May and June and again in August.

The larvae feed on Salix alba, Salix babylonica, Salix daphnoides, Salix × fragilis, Salix elaeagnos (syn. S. incana [Schrank]), Salix purpurea, Salix triandra and Salix viminalis. They mine the leaves of their host plant. They create a large, lower-surface tentiform mine, generally against the leaf margin and often low in the leaf. The lower epidermis is strongly folded and the mine is strongly contracted, causing the leaf margin to fold over the mine in a tube-like fashion. Pupation takes place in a light brown cocoon without frass, which is instead deposited in a corner of the mine.

References

External links
 

salictella
Moths described in 1846
Moths of Asia
Moths of Europe
Taxa named by Philipp Christoph Zeller